Hell Hole Gorge is a national park in South West Queensland, Australia, 912 km west of Brisbane. It is characterized by steep cliffs up to 45 meters high along the Powell Creek and Spencer Creek. Notable waterholes are the Hell Hole Waterhole (0.38 hectares) and Spencer's Waterhole (0.22 hectares). A campground offering primitive camping is available, no potable water is available on site. Access is by four wheel drive vehicles.

Some of the plants that come to life here after rain are Hakea maconochiena, Thryptomene hexandra, Acacia spania and Euphorbia sarcostemmoides.

The average elevation of the terrain is 262 meters.

References

See also

 Protected areas of Queensland

National parks of Queensland
Protected areas established in 1992
South West Queensland